MJIL may refer to:

Masters of Jurisprudence in Indian Law

 Melbourne Journal of International Law
 Minnesota Journal of International Law